Alexandre Fayollat (6 March 1889 – 12 April 1957) was a French athlete. He competed in the men's 3 miles team race at the 1908 Summer Olympics.

References

1889 births
1957 deaths
Athletes (track and field) at the 1908 Summer Olympics
French male middle-distance runners
Olympic athletes of France
Place of birth missing